Novy Berkadak (Yañı Berqaźaq) is a rural locality (a village) in Arovsky Selsoviet, Chishminsky District, Bashkortostan, Russia. The population was 4 as of 2010. There are 3 streets.

Geography 
Novy Berkadak is located 27 km east of Chishmy (the district's administrative centre) by road. Chernigovka is the nearest rural locality.

References 

Rural localities in Chishminsky District